Ho?: Horie Yui Character Best Album, also known as , is a compilation album by Yui Horie released in 2004. It features songs from various Japanese anime shows, including music from Love Hina and Fruits Basket.  It also has exclusive new versions of the Love Hina songs "Sakura saku" and "Itsumademo dokomademo".

Track listing
 PINCH!
 my best friend
 Dear mama
 空のように...    (Sora no yō ni…, Like the sky...)
 ハートはうらがえし    (Hāto wa uragaeshi, My heart is upside down)
 ここで良かったね    (Koko de yokatta ne, Isn't it great to be here?)
 Destiny
 Girlish
 春だもの!-成瀬川なる version-    (Haru da Mono!, Because it's Spring! (Naru Narusegawa version))
 For フルーツバスケット    (For furūtsu basuketto, For Fruits Basket)
 小さな祈り    (Chiisana inori, A little prayer)
 キラリ☆宝物    (Kirari takaramono, Sparkling treasure)
 Be for you, be for me
 その先のJustice    (Sono saki no justice, That justice just now)
 IN YOU
 青薄    (Aosusuki, Green susuki grass)
 サクラサク - ほっ? version    (Sakura saku, Blooming sakura (Ho? version))
 イツマデモドコマデモ - ほっ? version    (Itsumademo dokomademo, Forever, anywhere (Ho? version))

External links
Detailed album info

Yui Horie albums
Anime soundtracks
2003 compilation albums
2003 soundtrack albums